The Colombia national football team represents Colombia in international association football. The team is managed by the Colombian Football Federation, which governs football in Colombia, and competes as a member of the CONMEBOL, which includes the countries of South America.

List of players 
Leonel Álvarez
Juan Pablo Ángel
Víctor Hugo Aristizábal
Faustino Asprilla
Antony de Ávila
Miguel Calero
James Rodríguez
Juan Cuadrado
Iván Córdoba
Daniel Cruz
Andrés Escobar
Delio "Maravilla" Gamboa
René Higuita
Carlos Llamosa
Martín Arzuaga
Harold Lozano
Faryd Mondragón
Tressor Moreno
Óscar Pareja
Luis Amaranto Perea
Léider Preciado
Luis Gabriel Rey
Freddy Rincón
Efraín Sánchez
Carlos Valderrama
Adolfo Valencia
Iván René Valenciano
Willington Ortiz
Mario Yepes
Aquivaldo Mosquera

Footballers
Colombia
Association football player non-biographical articles